Fuji Xerox Towers (formerly IBM Towers) is a high-rise skyscraper located in Downtown Core, Singapore. It is located on 80 Anson Road, in the zone of Shenton Way and Tanjong Pagar. The building sits within four roads, namely Tanjong Pagar Road, Bernam Street, Keppel Road and Anson Road.

The building is next to the Ayer Rajah Expressway, and close to the Lippo Centre, RCL Centre, Realty Centre, and Anson House, all of which are roughly 100 metres away. The 38-storey high freehold development rises 165.0 metres above ground.

In December 2005, the Fuji Xerox Towers was conferred the Energy Smart Label Award from the Energy Sustainability Unit of the National University of Singapore and Singapore's National Environment Agency.

History
Fuji Xerox Towers was developed by City Developments Limited, and was completed in 1987. Other firms involved in the development include Mitsubishi Elevator and Escalator and IBM Singapore.

Naming
Fuji Xerox Towers was previously called IBM Towers, as IBM Singapore had been the anchor tenant since the building's opening until 2004. In mid-August 2004, Fuji Xerox leased  of office space, spread over 7 levels. It made Fuji Xerox the main anchor tenant with about a quarter of leasable space, thereby earning it naming rights. While Fuji Xerox moved into the towers, IBM moved in stages to Changi Business Park over recent years.

Fuji Xerox Singapore
In 1965, Fuji Xerox Singapore was still part of the Rank Xerox organisation, a joint venture between Rank and Xerox Organisation. The Singapore branch was first incorporated as Rank Xerox (Overseas) Pte Ltd and later renamed as Rank Xerox (Singapore) Pte Ltd in 1985. In 1991, Rank Xerox Singapore was sold to Fuji Xerox Company Ltd of Japan and was renamed Fuji Xerox Singapore.

Redevelopment
In July 2020, CDL announced that Fuji Xerox Towers will be demolished and redeveloped into a 51-storey mixed-use integrated development on its site, comprising residential apartments, serviced apartments and commercial areas. Demolition will commence in 2H 2021.

See also
 List of tallest buildings in Singapore

References

External links 

City Developments Limited
Former skyscrapers
Raffles Place
Skyscraper office buildings in Singapore
Downtown Core (Singapore)
Fuji Xerox
Office buildings completed in 1987
20th-century architecture in Singapore